Peter Shaw Ashton (born 27 June 1934) is a British botanist. He is Charles Bullard Professor of Forestry at Harvard University, and director of the Arnold Arboretum there from 1978 to 1987.

Born in Boscombe, Bournemouth, England, Ashton received his B.A. in Biology (1956), M.A. in Biology (1960) and Ph.D. Botany (1962) from the University of Cambridge. He has worked for many years on research projects to promote the conservation and sustainable use of tropical forests, and was instrumental in the project by the Center for Tropical Forest Science to formulate a network of Forest Dynamic Plots which are surveyed regularly to sample the health of the forest; he won the Japan Prize for this in 2007.

In 1983, Ashton was elected a Fellow of the American Academy of Arts and Sciences. He was elected Honorary Fellow of the Association for Tropical Biology and Conservation (ATBC) during the ATBC Annual meeting held in Kunming, China, in 2006. In 2015 the ATBC created in his honor the Peter Ashton Prize, awarded annually to the outstanding article published in the journal Biotropica by a student.

References 

1934 births
Alumni of the University of Cambridge
Arnold Arboretum
20th-century British botanists
Fellows of the American Academy of Arts and Sciences
Forestry academics
British foresters
American foresters
Living people
Harvard University faculty
People from Boscombe
British expatriates in the United States